Newton Kyme is a village in the civil parish of Newton Kyme cum Toulston near the River Wharfe, in the Selby district, in the English county of North Yorkshire. The population of the civil parish at the 2011 Census was 275. It is near the town of Tadcaster. For transport there is the A659 road nearby. Newton Kyme has a church and a castle called Kyme Castle.

History
Newton Kyme is mentioned in the Domesday Book as belonging to Count Robert of Mortain, having 15 villagers and one priest. A church has been known on the site since at least the 12th century, and the current structure, the Church of St Andrew, is grade I listed. The name of the village derives from Old English Neowa tun, meaning New homestead (or village), combined with the name Kyme, a surname of one of the manorial families in the village. In the 13th century, the manor and advowson passed to the Kyme family who originated at Kesteven in Lincolnshire. The village lies at the north-western edge of the Selby District, in an area of green belt, with the main part of the village in a conservation area.

West of the village is the site of two Roman forts, two Roman camps, and Iron Age enclosure, Bronze Age barrows and a Neolithic henge monument. the site has been designated as a scheduled monument. the Newton Kyme Hall and estate was built in the 18th century by Admiral Robert Fairfax. The hall is grade II* listed with extensive landscaped gardens. Kyme Castle, the site of which lies to the east of the hall, was possibly the seat of the Fairfaxes until Robert Fairfax built Newton Kyme Hall. The castle is believed to have fallen into ruins in the 16th century.

Newton Kyme used to have a railway station on the Harrogate–Church Fenton line, which was located on the south side of the A659 road. It was closed down in 1964. A paper and packaging mill used to be located in the parish, but this was closed in 2001 and was derelict until 2016, when a new set of houses were built on the site.

At the 2001 Census, the parish had a population of 281, which had fallen slightly to 275 by the time of the 2011 Census. In 2015, North Yorkshire County Council estimated the population to be 270.

Notable people
Robert Fairfax, and admiral in the Royal Navy, was born and is buried in the village
Owen Oglethorpe, Bishop of Carlisle who crowned Queen Elizabeth I

References

Sources

External links

Map of the village
Parish council website
Newton Kyme on About Britain

Villages in North Yorkshire
Selby District